"Puff (Up in Smoke)" is a song and single written by Bill Giant, Bernie Baum and Florence Kaye, performed by Kenny Lynch and released in 1962. 

English comedian and entertainer, Lynch who died in 2019, had eight chart hits. "Puff (Up in Smoke)" was the second hit, making number 33 in the UK Singles Charts in 1962 staying in the charts for 6 weeks.

References 

1962 songs
1962 singles
Kenny Lynch songs
Songs written by Bill Giant
Songs written by Bernie Baum
Songs written by Florence Kaye
His Master's Voice singles